Dinochloa is a genus of tropical clumping high-climbing bamboos in the grass family.

These species bear zigzag culms and fleshy fruits. They are found in the hill forests and lowland dipterocarp forest of southern China, Southeast Asia, and the eastern part of the Indian subcontinent.

Species

formerly included
see Cyrtochloa Maclurochloa Melocalamus 
 Dinochloa compactiflora - Melocalamus compactiflorus  
 Dinochloa elevatissima - Melocalamus elevatissimus 
 Dinochloa gracilis - Melocalamus mastersii  
 Dinochloa indica - Melocalamus indicus 
 Dinochloa major - Cyrtochloa major  
 Dinochloa montana - Maclurochloa montana

References

Bambusoideae
Bambusoideae genera